The Council of Science Editors (CSE), formerly the Council of Biology Editors (CBE; 1965–2000) and originally the Conference of Biology Editors (CBE; 1957–1965), is a United States-based nonprofit organization that supports editorial practice among scientific writers. In 2008, the CSE adopted the slogan "CSE: Education, Ethics, and Evidence for Editors (E4)".

A volunteer board of directors leads the Council, with the assistance of several committees. CSE is managed by Kellen Company, located in Wheat Ridge, Colorado.

History and organization

The organization was established in 1957 by the National Science Foundation and the American Institute of Biological Sciences as the Conference of Biology Editors (CBE). In 1965, the organization incorporated as the Council of Biology Editors "and soon thereafter expanded membership to include all scientific publishing endeavors from science editors to copy editors." On January 1, 2000, it was renamed the Council of Science Editors.

The membership of CSE comprises editorial professionals, mainly in the United States.

As well as providing services and advice online, CSE holds an annual meeting that includes short courses on topics such as journal editorship, publication management, manuscript editing, and journal metrics.

Publications 

CSE publishes a style guide for scientific papers, Scientific Style and Format: The CSE Manual for Authors, Editors, and Publishers, although CSE style is not as widely used as other scientific styles such as AMA style and APA style. In 2014, CSE partnered with the University of Chicago Press to use the successful online platform of the Chicago Manual of Style (CMOS or CMS) (which provides users with search and personal annotation of the manual) to publish Scientific Style and Format online. As of 2014, it is in the 8th edition. The 7th edition was published in 2006 and the 6th in 1994.
Science Editor is the quarterly publication of the CSE; after one year, articles are available as open access (delayed open access).

See also 

 List of style guides
 The Chicago Manual of Style
 APA style
 AuthorAID
 Association of American Publishers
 American Association for the Advancement of Science
 American Institute of Biological Sciences
 Association for Learned and Professional Society Publishers
 American Medical Writers Association
 Board of Editors in the Life Sciences (BELS)
 Committee on Publication Ethics
 European Association of Science Editors
 National Association of Science Writers
 Uniform Requirements for Manuscripts Submitted to Biomedical Journals

References

External links 
 www.councilscienceeditors.org, CSE homepage

Bibliography
Communications and media organizations based in the United States
Professional associations based in the United States
Science writing organizations